= Hanapur railway station =

Railway station in Hanapur, Pakistan

Coordinates: 33.025005°N 73.698823°E

General information
- Owner: Ministry of Railways

Other information
- Station code: HNPR

History
- Former names: Great Indian Peninsula Railway
Location

Hanapur railway station (Urdu: ہانا پور ریلوے اسٹیشن) is located in Pakistan.

== See also ==
- List of railway stations in Pakistan
- Pakistan Railways
